Nonlabens agnitus is a bacterium from the genus of Nonlabens.

References

Flavobacteria
Bacteria described in 2012